Karla Elizabeth Flores Orellana (born 14 April 1998) is a Salvadoran footballer who plays as a midfielder for CD FAS and El Salvador women's national team.

Club career
Flores has played for FAS in El Salvador.

International career
Flores capped for El Salvador at senior level during the 2018 CONCACAF Women's Championship qualification.

See also
List of El Salvador women's international footballers

References

1998 births
Living people
Salvadoran women's footballers
Women's association football midfielders
El Salvador women's international footballers